The Baltimore Burn is a Women's American football team that last played in the Women's Spring Football League in 2015.  Formerly a member of the National Women's Football Association from 2001 to 2008 and the Women's Football Alliance from 2009 to 2010, they played in the Women's Spring Football League from 2011 to 2015.  The Burn first played at Art Modell Field on the campus of Mergenthaler Vocational Technical Senior High School, but in 2013 they relocated to Utz Towardowizc field in Patterson Park.

In 2020 the team announced membership in the Women's Tackle Football League.  Play was cancelled for the 2020 season due to the COVID-19 pandemic, but the league expects to play in 2021.

Season-By-Season

|-
| colspan="6" align="center" | Baltimore Burn (NWFL)
|-
|2001 || 0 || 7 || 0 || 5th Northern || –
|-
|2002 || 9 || 2 || 0 || 1st Mid-Atlantic || Lost League Quarterfinal (Philadelphia)
|-
| colspan="6" align="center" | Baltimore Burn (NWFA)
|-
|2003 || 7 || 3 || 0 || 2nd Northern Mid-Atlantic || Lost Northern Conference Quarterfinal (Cleveland)
|-
|2004 || 4 || 4 || 0 || 3rd Northern Mid-Atlantic || –
|-
|2005 || 4 || 4 || 0 || 11th Northern || –
|-
|2006 || 4 || 4 || 0 || 2nd Northern North Atlantic || –
|-
|2007 || 4 || 5 || 0 || 1st Northern South || Lost Northern Conference Quarterfinal (West Michigan)
|-
|2008 || 2 || 6 || 0 || 3rd Northern East || –
|-
| colspan="6" align="center" | Baltimore Burn (WFA)
|-
|2009 || 5 || 4 || 0 || 3rd National Northeast || –
|-
|2010 || 6 || 3 || 0 || 1st National East || Lost National Conference Quarterfinal (Columbus)
|-
| colspan="6" align="center" | Baltimore Burn (WSFL)
|-
|2011 || 6 || 0 || 0 || 1st League || Declared WSFL Champions (based on regular season record)
|-
|2012 || 3 || 5 || 0 || 2nd American Northeast || Lost American Conference Semifinal (New Jersey) 
|-
|2013 || 0 || 3 || 0 || – || –
|-
|2014 || 1 || 4 || 0 || 2nd Eastern || Lost Eastern Conference Championship (Memphis) 
|-
|2015 || 1 || 4 || 0 || 5th Northern || –
|-
!Totals || 56 || 58 || 0
|colspan="2"| (including playoffs)

Season schedules

2009

** = Game won by forfeit

2010

2011

** = Game won by forfeit

References

Baltimore Burn official website

Women's Spring Football League teams
American football teams in Baltimore
Defunct American football teams in Maryland
American football teams established in 2001
American football teams disestablished in 2015
2001 establishments in Maryland
2015 disestablishments in Maryland
Women's sports in Maryland